Neoduma caprimimoides is a moth of the subfamily Arctiinae. It was described by Rothschild in 1912. It is found in New Guinea.

The forewings are rufous chocolate with sooty black zigzag lines and a black spot at the tornus. The hindwings are sooty mouse-grey.

References

 Natural History Museum Lepidoptera generic names catalog

Lithosiini
Moths described in 1912